Engraved metal plates hold a special significance in the Latter Day Saint movement because in 1827, the founder of that religion, Joseph Smith, claimed to have obtained a set of engraved golden plates from an angel and from them translated into English the Book of Mormon, a religious text of that religious tradition.

Latter Day Saints believe that other engraved metal plates exist, most of which are mentioned in the Book of Mormon. In addition, Mormon apologists argue that the golden plates are part of a long tradition of writing on engraved metal plates in the Middle East.

The golden plates

The golden plates are a set of bound and engraved metal plates that Latter Day Saint denominations believe are the source of Joseph Smith's English translation of the Book of Mormon. Although several witnesses said they saw the plates, Smith said that he returned them to an angel after the translation was completed. Most Latter Day Saints assume their authenticity as a matter of faith.

Smith said he discovered the plates on September 22, 1823, on Cumorah hill, Manchester, New York, where he said they had been hidden in a buried box and protected for centuries by the angel Moroni, a resurrected ancient American prophet-historian, who had been last to write on them. Smith claimed that the angel required him to obey certain commandments prior to receiving them and that his inability to obey prevented him from obtaining the plates until four years later, on September 22, 1827.

During this period, Smith also began dictating written commandments in the voice of God, including a commandment to form a new church and to choose eleven men who would join Smith as witnesses of the plates. These witnesses later declared, in two separate written statements attached to the 1830 published Book of Mormon, that they had seen the plates.

The Book of Mormon is accepted by adherents of the Latter Day Saint movement as a sacred text.

Other plates referred to in the Book of Mormon
In addition to the golden plates, the Book of Mormon refers to several other sets of books written on metal plates: 
The brass plates, originally in the custody of Laban, containing the writings of Old Testament prophets before the Babylonian exile, as well as the otherwise unknown prophets Zenos, Zenoch, Neum, and possibly others.
The large plates of Nephi, the source of the text abridged by Mormon and engraved on the golden plates.
The small plates of Nephi, the source of the first and second books of Nephi, and the books of Jacob, Enos, Jarom and Omni, which replaced the lost 116 pages.
The plates of Limhi
 A set of twenty-four plates found by the people of Limhi containing the record of the Jaredites, translated by King Mosiah, and abridged by Moroni as the Book of Ether.

Kinderhook plates

In 1843, Smith acquired a set of six small bell-shaped plates, known as the Kinderhook Plates, found in Kinderhook, Pike County, Illinois. Although Smith did not translate the plates, William Clayton, his secretary, wrote that Smith said they contained "the history of the person with whom they were found and he was a descendant of Ham through the loins of Pharaoh king of Egypt." As Richard Bushman has written, "Joseph may not have detected the fraud, but he did not swing into a full-fledged translation as he had with the Egyptian scrolls. The trap did not quite spring shut, which foiled the conspirators original plan." After Smith's death, the Kinderhook plates were presumed lost, and for decades the Church of Jesus Christ of Latter-day Saints (LDS Church) published facsimiles of them in its official History of the Church. In 1980, the Kinderhook Plates were tested at Brigham Young University and determined to have been manufactured during the nineteenth century. Today, the LDS Church acknowledges that the Kinderhook plates were a hoax.

Voree Plates and the Book of the Law of the Lord

James J. Strang, one of many rival claimants to succeed Smith in the 1844 succession crisis, said that he had discovered and translated a set of plates known as the Voree Plates or "Voree Record." Like Smith, Strang produced witnesses to testify to his plates' authenticity. Although Strang's attempt to supplant Brigham Young as Smith's successor proved abortive, Smith's mother, Lucy Mack Smith, and for a time all living witnesses to the Book of Mormon, including the three Whitmers and Martin Harris (although perhaps excluding Oliver Cowdery), accepted "Strang's leadership, angelic call, metal plates, and his translation of these plates as authentic." Strang equally claimed to have discovered and translated the Plates of Laban spoken of in the Book of Mormon. As with the Voree Plates, Strang produced witnesses who authenticated them. Strang's purported translation of these plates was published in 1850 as the Book of the Law of the Lord, which together with the Voree Record, is accepted as Scripture by members of Strang's diminutive church, the Church of Jesus Christ of Latter Day Saints (Strangite).

Metal plates in Mormon studies
William J. Hamblin argues that the golden plates are part of a long tradition of writing on engraved metal plates in the ancient Mediterranean.  Some examples of brief hieroglyphic inscriptions on bronze are known from ancient Egypt. Some ancient European and Mesopotamian cultures did keep short records on metal plates, but extant examples are rare, have comparatively brief texts, and are extremely thin. A six-page, 24-carat gold book bound together with rings, alleged to be written in Etruscan, was found in Bulgaria; and in 2005, an eight-page golden codex bound with rings, allegedly from the Achaemenid period, was recovered from smugglers by the Iranian police. The Pyrgi Tablets (now at the National Etruscan Museum, Rome) are gold plates with a bilingual Phoenician-Etruscan text. In the caves where the Dead Sea Scrolls were found, archaeologists later discovered the "Copper Scroll," two rolled sheets of copper that may describe locations where treasures of the Second Temple of Jerusalem may have been hidden. Another Israelite example is the tiny "Silver Scrolls" dated to the 7th century BCE (First Temple period), containing just a few verses of scripture, perhaps the oldest extant passages of the Old Testament. Nevertheless, there is no known extant example of writing on metal plates from the ancient Mediterranean longer than the eight-page Persian codex, and none from any ancient civilization in the Western Hemisphere. However, the Mandaeans of Iran are reported to maintain their entire Book of John in metal book made entirely of lead plates

See also

Reformed Egyptian
Jordan Lead Codices
List of plates (Latter Day Saint movement)

Notes

References

.

Further reading

History of the Latter Day Saint movement
Joseph Smith
Book of Mormon artifacts
Mormon studies
Metals